Modipane is a village in Kgatleng District of Botswana. The village is located 25 km east of Gaborone, close to the border with South Africa and has a primary school. The population was 2,423 in 2001 census.

References

Kgatleng District
Villages in Botswana